Don't Worry 'Bout Me is a 1962 studio album by the American singer Billy Eckstine. It was arranged by Billy Byers, conducted by Bobby Tucker, and produced by Quincy Jones. The album peaked at 92 on the Billboard 200, and was highlighted at a "National Breakout Album" by Billboard in November 1962.

Track listing 
 "Till There Was You" (Meredith Willson) - 2:17
 "What Kind of Fool Am I?" (Leslie Bricusse, Anthony Newley) - 2:53
 "It Isn't Fair" (Richard Himber, Frank Warshauer, Sylvester Sprigato) - 3:02
 "(Love Is) The Tender Trap" (Jimmy Van Heusen, Sammy Cahn) - 3:25
 "Beauty of True Love" - 2:24
 "The Exodus Song" (Ernest Gold) - 2:58
 "Guilty" (Richard Whiting, Harry Akst, Gus Kahn) - 3:04
 "Don't Worry 'bout Me" (Rube Bloom, Ted Koehler) - 3:21
 "Tender Is the Night" - 3:13
 "Jeannie" - 2:36
 "Stranger In Town" - 3:09
 "I Want to Talk About You" (Billy Eckstine) - 3:05

Personnel 
 Billy Eckstine - vocals
 Billy Byers - arranger
 Bobby Tucker - conductor
 Quincy Jones - producer

References

1962 albums
Albums arranged by Billy Byers
Albums produced by Quincy Jones
Billy Eckstine albums
Mercury Records albums